Adnan Abidi is an Indian photographer based in New Delhi. He has been part of three Pulitzer Prize-winning packages for photography as part of Reuters' photography team.

Work 
Adnan started his career as a darkroom assistant in 1997. He worked at Pan-Asia News Agency, Indo Photo News and Press Trust of India, and eventually started working for Reuters as a stringer and was later given a staff position. He has captured several challenging situations over the course of his career, including 1999 Kandahar hijack of Indian Airlines flight IC814, 2004 Indian Ocean earthquake and tsunami, 2005 Kashmir earthquake, the 2011–2012 Maldives political crisis, 2013 Cyclone Phailin in Orissa, 2015 Nepal earthquake and the 2016 Dhaka attack.

Awards 
In 2017, Abidi covered the exodus of Rohingyas and he and his colleague Danish Siddiqui became the first Indians to win a Pulitzer Prize for Feature Photography as part of the photography staff of Reuters.

He won the 2020 Pulitzer Prize for Breaking News Photography for his coverage of the 2019–20 Hong Kong protests.

In 2022, Abidi's work was part of another Pulitzer Prize winning photography package which covered the COVID-19 pandemic in India, increasing his tally to three Pulitzer Prizes.

In 2022 Abidi’s work title ‘Covid Horror in Delhi’ won NPPA Best of Photojournalism’ first place in Breaking News Story category.

References 

Living people
Pulitzer Prize for Feature Photography winners
Pulitzer Prize for Photography winners
Indian photojournalists
Photographers from Delhi
21st-century Indian Muslims
Reuters people
Year of birth missing (living people)